The following is a list of notable deaths in March 2014.

Entries for each day are listed alphabetically by surname. A typical entry lists information in the following sequence:
Name, age, country of citizenship and reason for notability, established cause of death, reference.

March 2014

1
Khandokar Mahbub Uddin Ahmad, 88, Bangladeshi politician.
G.K. Chadha, 73, Indian economist, heart attack.
Nancy Charest, 54, Canadian politician, Quebec MNA for Matane (2003–2007), hypothermia.
J. W. Cole, 86, American football coach and player.
Prafulla Dahanukar, 80, Indian painter.
Dayuma, 83-84, Huaorani convert to Christianity.
A. Richard Diebold Jr., 80, American linguistic anthropologist.
Philippe Ebly, 93, Belgian science fiction and fantasy writer.
Andy Gilpin, 93, Canadian Olympic champion ice hockey player (1948).
Zdeněk Hajný, 72, Czech artist.
Alan Heyman, 82, American-born South Korean traditional music scholar.
Eckart Höfling, 77, German Catholic priest and missionary.
Bangaru Laxman, 74, Indian politician, President of the Bharatiya Janata Party (2000–2001), cardiac arrest.
Les Layton, 92, American baseball player (New York Giants).
Donald Mahley, 71, American diplomat and army officer, representative to the Organisation for the Prohibition of Chemical Weapons, pancreatic cancer.
Dave O'Brien, 57, American collegiate athletic director (Long Beach State, Temple, Northeastern), cancer.
Dimitrios Pappos, 74, Greek Olympic skier.
Alain Resnais, 91, French film director (Night and Fog, Hiroshima mon amour).
Tommy Ed Roberts, 73, American politician, member of the Alabama House of Representatives (1974–1978) and Senate (1994–2006).
Robert L. Spencer, 94, American fashion designer, heart attack.
Paul Tant, 68, Belgian politician, Mayor of Kruishoutem (1977–2009).
Gyula Tóth, 72, Hungarian footballer.
Werner Uebelmann, 92, Swiss entrepreneur and writer.
John Wilkinson, 73, British politician, MP for Bradford West (1970–1974) and Ruislip-Northwood (1979–2005).
Alejandro Zaffaroni, 91, Uruguayan-born American chemist and entrepreneur, dementia.

2
Ryhor Baradulin, 79, Belarusian poet.
Peter Bares, 78, German organist and composer.
Ted Bergmann, 93, American sports television and entertainment producer (NBC), complications following surgery.
Molly Bobak, 92, Canadian war artist, recipient of the Order of Canada (1995).
Bhuvnesh Chaturvedi, 85, Indian politician, State Minister (1993–1996), MP (1978–1996) and Rajasthan MLA for Kota (1972–1977).
Porky Chedwick, 96, American radio announcer.
Sal DeRosa, 82, Italian-born American soccer coach.
Gail Gilmore, 76, Canadian actress, lung cancer.
Stanley Grinstein, 86, American businessman, kidney disease.
Jacob Jervell, 88, Norwegian theologian, priest and author.
Justin Kaplan, 88, American biographer, Pulitzer Prize winner for Biography or Autobiography (1967), Parkinson's disease.
Benjamin Lambert, 77, American politician, member of the Virginia House of Delegates (1978–1986) and Senate (1986–2008).
Rudolph Rummel, 81, American political scientist.
Stanley Rubin, 96, American film and television producer (Revenge, Bracken's World, The Ghost & Mrs. Muir).
Clément Sagna, 71, Senegalese Olympic athlete.
Scott Vanstone, 66, Canadian cryptographer, cancer.

3
Ali Anwar, 79, Bangladeshi litterateur and translator.
Robert Ashley, 83, American composer, complications from cirrhosis.
Christine Buchegger, 71, Austrian actress, complications from surgery.
Martin Gutzwiller, 88, Swiss-born American physicist.
Stan Koziol, 48, American soccer player, leukemia.
Kurt Chew-Een Lee, 88, American military officer, first Asian-American officer in the Marine Corps, recipient of the Navy Cross, suspected heart attack.
Curtis McClarin, 44, American actor (The Happening, Law & Order), brain aneurysm.
Harold Mowery, 84, American politician, member of the Pennsylvania House of Representatives (1976–1990) and Senate (1993–2004), pneumonia.
Sherwin B. Nuland, 83, American National Book Award-winning author and surgeon, prostate cancer.
F. Edward Osborne, 89, American politician, member of the Idaho House of Representatives (1989–1990) and Senate (1991–1992).
William R. Pogue, 84, American astronaut (Skylab) and Air Force pilot (Thunderbirds).
Juan A. Rivero, 90, American Puerto Rican biologist, founder of the Dr. Juan A. Rivero Zoo, cancer. 
Billy Robinson, 74, British wrestler and trainer.
Joab Thomas, 81, American university administrator, Chancellor of NC State (1975–1981), President of the University of Alabama (1981–1988) and Penn State (1990–1995).
Aino-Maija Tikkanen, 86, Finnish actress (The Harvest Month, Mother of Mine), recipient of the Order of the Lion of Finland (1983).
Xu Chongde, 85, Chinese political scientist and professor.
Shōji Yasui, 85, Japanese actor (The Burmese Harp).

4
Richard W. Burkhardt, 95, American academic, President of Ball State University (1978).
Gary Carson, 64, American poker player, academic and author, complications from vascular and renal disease.
Renato Cioni, 84, Italian operatic tenor.
Barrie Cooke, 83, English-born Irish artist.
Hollie Donan, 85, American football player.
László Fekete, 59, Hungarian footballer.
Mark Freidkin, 60, Russian writer.
Lawrence Patrick Henry, 79, South African Roman Catholic prelate, Archbishop of Cape Town (1990–2009). 
Dame Elaine Kellett-Bowman, 90, British politician and barrister, MP for Lancaster (1970–1997) and MEP (1975–1984).
Jack Kinzler, 94, American aeronautical engineer, NASA technical director that helped save Skylab.
Chuck Kress, 92, American baseball player (Chicago White Sox).
John Wayne Mason, 90, American physiologist.
Maja Petrin, 41, Croatian television and stage actress, heart failure.
Boris Pustyntsev, 78, Russian human rights activist.
Wu Tianming, 74, Chinese film director and producer, heart attack.

5
Nana Abdullahi, 54, Nigerian judge, first female High Court judge in Jigawa (since 2010).
bartcop, 60, American blogger.
Iain Donald Campbell, 72, Scottish biophysicist.
Deep, Punjabi-American rap artist.
Sir Robin Dunn, 96, British jurist, Lord Justice of Appeal (1980–1984).
Geoff Edwards, 83, American game show host (Starcade, Treasure Hunt) and actor (Petticoat Junction), pneumonia.
John Uzzell Edwards, 79, British painter.
Nigel Groom, 89, British author and perfume connoisseur.
Eli Hunt, 60, American Ojibwe politician, tribal chairman of Leech Lake Band (1996–2002). 
Scott Kalvert, 49, American director (The Basketball Diaries), suicide. 
Little Bridge, 8, New Zealand racehorse, colic.
Ernest Anthony Lowe, 85, British economist.
Alexander Macdonald, 95, Canadian politician, MP (1957–1958).
Ailsa McKay, 50, Scottish economist and government policy advisor, cancer.
Buck Melton, 90, American politician, author and lawyer, Mayor of Macon, Georgia (1975–1979).
Leopoldo María Panero, 65, Spanish poet.
Hank Rieger, 95, American television executive, President of the Academy of Television Arts and Sciences (1973–1975, 1977–1980).
Ros Saboeut, 72, Cambodian musician activist and film subject, complications from a fall.
Dave Sampson, 73, English rock singer.
Dov Schperling, 76, Latvian-born Israeli Zionist activist.
Luis Villoro, 91, Spanish-born Mexican philosopher and writer.

6
Joe Abbey, 88, American football player (Chicago Bears).
Alemayehu Atomsa, 45, Ethiopian politician, President of Oromia Region (2010–2014), typhoid fever.
Jean-Louis Bertucelli, 71, French film director (Ramparts of Clay, Docteur Françoise Gailland).
Christian Casadesus, 101, French actor.
Viking Olver Eriksen, 91, Norwegian nuclear physicist.
Maurice Faure, 92, French politician and diplomat, Interior Minister, Justice Minister, MP and Senator for Lot, last living signatory of the Treaty of Rome.
Jack Finlay, 92, American football player (Los Angeles Rams).
Martin Gottfried, 80, American drama critic and biographer, complications from pneumonia.
Sérgio Guerra, 66, Brazilian economist and politician, member of the Federal Senate (2003–2011), lung cancer.
Tony Herbert, 94, Irish politician (14th & 16th Senator) and hurler (Limerick).
Antonio Hidalgo Rodríguez, 71, Spanish footballer (Celta Vigo).
Gurth Hoyer-Millar, 84, Scottish sportsman.
Frank Jobe, 88, American orthopedic surgeon, invented Tommy John surgery.
Jojon, 66, Indonesian comedian, complications from cardiovascular disease.
David Koff, 74, American documentary film maker and political activist, suicide.
Barbro Kollberg, 96, Swedish actress.
Joe Lane, 78, American politician, member of the Arizona House of Representatives (1979–1989), Speaker (1987–1989), Parkinson's disease.
Sheila MacRae, 92, English-born American actress (The Honeymooners).
Gwen Matthewman, 86, English speed knitter.
Jagat Singh Mehta, 91, Indian diplomat and author, Foreign Secretary (1976–1979), High Commissioner to Tanzania (1970–1974).
Ron Murphy, 80, Canadian ice hockey player (New York Rangers, Chicago Blackhawks, Detroit Red Wings, Boston Bruins).
Martin Nesbitt, 67, American politician, member of the North Carolina Senate (2004–2014), stomach cancer.
Danny Pierce, 93, American artist.
Georgy Ragozin, 71, Russian army officer and academic. 
Luis Rentería, 25, Panamanian footballer (Tauro), lupus.
Peter Ruber, 73, American author and editor.
Manlio Sgalambro, 89, Italian philosopher and writer.
Margaret Spufford, 78, British historian.
Marion Stein, 87, British pianist.
David Talmage, 94, American immunologist.
Anthony Charles "Tony" Unger, 75, Rhodesian Olympic hockey player.

7
Lollu Sabha Balaji, 43, Indian comic actor.
Heiko Bellmann, 63, German biologist, writer and photographer.
Sir Richard Best, 80, British diplomat, Ambassador to Iceland (1989–1991).
Bob Charles, 72, English footballer (Southampton). 
Hal Douglas, 89, American voice actor and announcer, pancreatic cancer.
Peter Dunn, 87, British engineer.
Musa Geshaev, 73, Chechen poet, literary critic, songwriter, and historian.
Sir Thomas Hinde, 88, British novelist.
Anatoly Borisovich Kuznetsov, 83, Russian actor (White Sun of the Desert).
Peter Laker, 87, English cricketer (Sussex).
Arnulfo Mendoza, 59, Mexican artist and weaver, heart attack.
Tamás Nádas, 44, Hungarian aerobatics pilot and world champion air racer, plane crash.
Javier Naranjo Villegas, 95, Colombian Roman Catholic prelate, Bishop of Santa Marta (1971–1980). 
Ned O'Gorman, 84, American poet, pancreatic cancer.
Victor Shem-Tov, 99, Bulgarian-born Israeli politician, Health Minister (1970–1977), Chairman of Mapam.
Uwe Timm, 82, German writer.
Patti Wicks, 69, American jazz singer and pianist, heart failure.

8
Runa Akiyama, 59, Japanese voice actress, heart failure.
Tom Barrett, 79, English footballer.
Leo Bretholz, 93, Austrian-born American Holocaust survivor, activist and writer (Leap into Darkness).
Bud Bulling, 61, American baseball player (Minnesota Twins, Seattle Mariners).
Jerry Corbitt, 71, American guitarist, harmonica player, singer, songwriter, and record producer, lung cancer.
Rowan Cronjé, 76, Rhodesian politician.
James Ellis, 82, Northern Irish actor (Z-Cars), stroke.
Buren Fowler, 54, American rock and roll guitarist (Drivin' N Cryin', R.E.M.).
William Guarnere, 90, American World War II non-commissioned officer and author, key figure in Band of Brothers.
Omar Ould Hamaha, 50, Malian Islamist militia commander, air strike.
Roy Higgins, 75, Australian jockey (Light Fingers, Red Handed), Sport Australia Hall of Fame inductee (1987).
Wendy Hughes, 61, Australian AFI Award-winning actress (Careful, He Might Hear You), cancer.
Helmut Koenigsberger, 95, German-born British historian.
Evgeni Krasilnikov, 48, Russian Olympic silver-medalist volleyball player (1988).
Gerard Mortier, 70, Belgian opera director and administrator, pancreatic cancer.
Park Eun Ji, 35, South Korean politician.
Alan Rodgers, 54, American author and poet, winner of the Bram Stoker Award for Best Long Fiction (1987).
Larry Scott, 75, American bodybuilder, Mr. Olympia (1965, 1966), Alzheimer's disease.
David Smith, 88, American Olympic champion sailor (1960).
Randolph W. Thrower, 100, American politician and jurist, Commissioner of Internal Revenue (1969–1971).

9
Rafael Aburto, 100, Spanish architect.
Françoise Adnet, 89, French figurative painter.
Franklin S. Billings, Jr., 91, American politician (member and Speaker of the Vermont House of Representatives) and judge (US District Court, Vermont Supreme Court).
Greg Brough, 62, Australian Olympic swimmer (1968), cancer.
John Christie, 84, Scottish footballer (Southampton, Walsall).
Lionel Seymour Craig, 85, Barbadian politician, MP for Saint James (1966–1986), Cabinet Minister (1976–1986).
Mike Dietsch, 72, Canadian politician, cancer.
Mohammed Fahim, 56–57, Afghan politician and military commander, Vice President (since 2009), heart attack.
William Clay Ford, Sr., 88, American businessman (Ford Motor Company, Detroit Lions), pneumonia.
Valentin Fortunov, 56, Bulgarian writer, publisher and journalist.
Melba Hernández, 92, Cuban revolutionary, politician and diplomat, Ambassador to Vietnam and Cambodia, complications from diabetes.
Steve Hill, 60, American pastor and evangelist, melanoma.
Mike Jagosz, 48, American singer (L.A. Guns), aortic valvuolopathy.
Monika Kinley, 88, British art dealer, collector and curator.
Richard Liboff, 82, American physicist and author.
Husein Mehmedov, 90, Bulgarian Olympic silver-medalist wrestler (1956).
Nazario Moreno González, 44, Mexican drug lord, shot.
Carlos Moreno, 75, Argentine actor and director, heart attack.
Ebrahim Yazdan Panah, 75, Iranian Olympic middle-distance runner.
Guillo Pérez, 90, Dominican painter.
Justus Pfaue, 72, German author and screenwriter.
Joseph Sax, 78, American legal scholar, pioneer of environmental law, stroke.
James Schaffer, 104, American Christian leader.

10
Alias Ali, 75, Malaysian politician and newspaper editor (Bernama), MP for Hulu Terengganu (1978–1995), Chairman of Agro Bank, colon cancer.
Tom Ament, 76, American politician, Milwaukee County Executive (1992–2002).
Roldan Aquino, 65, Filipino actor, complications from a stroke.
Juan Balboa Boneke, 75, Equatorial Guinean politician and writer, kidney failure.
Olha Bura, 27, Ukrainian activist, blood infection.
Eileen Colgan, 80, Irish actress (Far and Away, My Left Foot, Angela's Ashes).
Francesco De Nittis, 80, Italian Roman Catholic prelate and diplomat, Apostolic Nuncio to PNG (1981–1985), El Salvador (1985–1990) and Uruguay (1990–1999).
Richard De Vere, 46, British illusionist (Blackpool Pleasure Beach), pneumonia and heart attack.
Guy Gauthier, 93, Canadian politician, member of the Legislative Assembly of Quebec.
Ludomir Goździkiewicz, 78, Polish politician, member of the Sejm (1989–1991).
Patricia Laffan, 94, British actress, multiple organ failure.
Georges Lamia, 80, French footballer.
Samuel W. Lewis, 83, American diplomat, Ambassador to Israel (1977–1985).
Cynthia Lynn, 77, Latvian-born American actress (Hogan's Heroes), multiple organ failure.
Allen Maxwell, 70, American politician, member of the Arkansas House of Representatives (2004–2010), Mayor of Monticello, Arkansas, heart attack.
Joe McGinniss, 71, American author and political journalist, prostate cancer.
Nicolás Mentxaka, 75, Spanish footballer (Athletic Bilbao).
Matthew Power, 39, American journalist and magazine editor (Harper's Magazine), complications from heatstroke and exhaustion.
John Pring, 86, New Zealand rugby union referee.
Vince Radcliffe, 68, English footballer (Portsmouth).
Tom Shanahan, 89, American broadcaster and sportscaster. 
Paul J. Sheehy, 79, American politician, member of the Massachusetts House of Representatives (1965–1972) and Senate (1984–1991).
T. J. Turner, 35, American football player (New England Patriots), cancer.
John Baird Tyson, 85, British explorer and mountaineer.
Rob Williams, 52, American basketball player (Denver Nuggets), heart failure.
William H. Vernon, 69, American politician, member of the Delaware House of Representatives (1977–1981), cancer.

11
Dean Bailey, 47, Australian football player (Essendon) and coach (Melbourne), lung cancer.
Brett Borgen, 79, Norwegian writer.
Joel Brinkley, 61, American journalist, Pulitzer Prize winner for International Reporting (1980), pneumonia.
Len Buckeridge, 77, Australian billionaire construction executive, founder of Buckeridge Group of Companies, heart attack.
Christine Buckley, 67, Irish activist, breast cancer.
Marilyn Butler, 77, British literary critic and academic, Rector of Exeter College, Oxford (1993–2004).
Bob Crow, 52, British trade unionist, General Secretary of the RMT (since 2002), aneurysm and heart attack.
Vladislav David, 86, Czech lawyer and academic.
Elisabeth Dhanens, 98, Belgian art historian. 
Berkin Elvan, 15, Turkish student, head trauma from projected tear-gas canister.
Nils Horner, 51, Swedish journalist (Sveriges Radio), shot.
Edmund Levy, 72, Israeli judge, member of the Supreme Court (2001–2012). 
Our Conor, 4, Irish Thoroughbred racehorse, fall.
G.S. Paramashivaiah, 95, Indian irrigation engineer.
John PiRoman, 62, American screenwriter and playwright.
Hermann Schleinhege, 98, German Luftwaffe ace during World War II and Iron Cross recipient.
Mehmooda Ali Shah, 94, Indian educationalist.
Marga Spiegel, 101, German writer.
Bobby Thompson, 74, American football player (Detroit Lions, Montreal Alouettes). 
Doru Tureanu, 60, Romanian Olympic ice hockey player (1976, 1980).
David Yeagley, 62, American Comanche political writer.

12
Cecil Abbott, 89, Australian police chief, Commissioner of New South Wales Police (1981–1984).
Bahram Askerov, 80, Azerbaijani physicist.
Věra Chytilová, 85, Czech film director, recipient of the Ordre des Arts et des Lettres, Medal of Merit and the Czech Lion award.
Phil Conley, 79, American Olympic athlete.
Myles Conte, 66, South African cricketer.
Richard Coogan, 99, American actor (Captain Video and His Video Rangers, The Californians).
Paul C. Donnelly, 90, American aerospace pioneer.
Med Flory, 87, American saxophonist (Supersax) and actor (Daniel Boone, Gomer Pyle, U.S.M.C., Lassie).
Jackie Gaughan, 93, American hotelier and casino owner (El Cortez, Las Vegas Club, The Western, Gold Spike).
Art Kenney, 97, American baseball player (Boston Bees).
Bill Knott, 73, American poet. 
Shawn Kuykendall, 32, American soccer player (D.C. United), thymic cancer.
René Llense, 100, French footballer.
Fortunatus M. Lukanima, 73, Tanzanian Roman Catholic prelate, Bishop of Arusha (1989–1998). 
Celmira Luzardo, 61, Colombian television actress.
Ola L. Mize, 82, American army officer, Korean War recipient of the Medal of Honor.
John Cullen Nugent, 93, Canadian artist, sculptor and photographer.
Kjell Nupen, 58, Norwegian artist, cancer.
Calvin Palmer, 73, English footballer, cancer.
José Policarpo, 78, Portuguese Roman Catholic cardinal, Patriarch of Lisbon (1998–2013), aortic aneurysm.
Jenny Romatowski, 86, American AAGPBL baseball player.
Zoja Rudnova, 67, Russian table tennis player. 
David Sive, 91, American environmental lawyer. 
Ray Still, 94, American classical oboist (Chicago Symphony Orchestra).
Jean Vallée, 72, Belgian songwriter and performer.

13
Reubin Askew, 85, American politician, Governor of Florida (1971–1979), member of the Florida House of Representatives (1958–1962) and Senate (1962–1971).
Bill Ballard, 67, Canadian concert promoter and sport franchise owner (Toronto Maple Leafs), cancer.
Chérifa, 88, Algerian singer-songwriter.
Angelo Martino Colombo, 78, Italian footballer.
Jan Erik Düring, 87, Norwegian director.
Benjamin Enríquez, 83, Filipino boxer.
Raymond Flood, 78, English cricketer (Hampshire).
Joseph Bacon Fraser, Jr., 88, American real estate developer.
Paulo Goulart, 81, Brazilian actor, cancer.
Al Harewood, 90, American jazz drummer.
Edward Haughey, Baron Ballyedmond, 70, Northern Irish politician, member of the House of Lords, founder of the Norbrook Group, helicopter crash.
Ahmad Tejan Kabbah, 82, Sierra Leonean politician, President (1996–1997, 1998–2007).
S. Mallikarjunaiah, 82, Indian politician, MP for Tumkur (1991–2009), Karnataka MLA for Tumkur (1971–1991), heart attack.
Vince McGlone, 97, New Zealand seaman and television personality.
Icchokas Meras, 79, Lithuanian-born Israeli writer, recipient of the Lithuanian National Prize (2010). 
Petar Miloševski, 40, Macedonian footballer (Enosis Neon Paralimni), traffic collision.· 
Serge Perrault, 93, French ballet dancer and teacher.
Pierre Prat, 84, French Olympic athlete.
Abby Singer, 96, American production manager (Remington Steele, St. Elsewhere), cancer.
 Wang King-ho, 97, Taiwanese physician.
Henk Weerink, 77, Dutch football referee.
Janusz Zabłocki, 88, Polish politician and Catholic activist, MP (1965–1985).

14
John Agoglia, 76, American television executive (NBC), instrumental in decision to replace Johnny Carson with Jay Leno, cancer.
Tony Benn, 88, British politician, Minister of Technology (1966–1970), Secretary of State (1974–1979), MP for Bristol South East (1950–1960, 1963–1983) and Chesterfield (1984–2001).
Otakar Brousek, Sr., 89, Czech actor.
Gary Burger, 72, American singer (The Monks), pancreatic cancer.
John Burgess, 82, British record producer and production company executive.
Cao Shunli, 52, Chinese human rights activist, complications from pneumonia.
Rodney M. Coe, 80, American medical sociologist.
Ted Cohen, 74, American philosopher.
Jiří Dadák, 88, Czechoslovakian Olympic hammer thrower.
John Bernard Philip Humbert, 9th Count de Salis-Soglio, 66, British major.
Yves Delacour, 83, French Olympic rower (1956).
Richard Dermer, 74, American restaurateur, founder of Hideaway Pizza.
Jon Ewing, 77, Australian actor and director.
Hans Fogh, 76, Danish-born Canadian Olympic sailor.
Alec Gaskell, 81, English footballer.  
Meir Har-Zion, 80, Israeli commando.
Vello Helk, 90, Estonian-born Danish historian. 
Gašo Knežević, 60, Serbian academic and politician, Minister of Education (2001–2004).
Sam Lacey, 66, American basketball player (Cincinnati Royals).
Roger Leir, 80, American podiatric surgeon and ufologist.
Hugh Lunghi, 93, British military interpreter (Winston Churchill), one of the last living Big Three participants, first British soldier to enter Hitler's bunker.
Warwick Parer, 77, Australian politician, Senator for Queensland (1984–2000), Minister for Resources and Energy (1996–1998).
Sam Peffer, 92, British commercial artist.
Werner Rackwitz, 84, German opera director and politician.
Bob Thomas, 92, American journalist (Associated Press) and biographer.
Manuel Torres Pastor, 83, Spanish footballer (Real Zaragoza, Real Madrid).
Ken Utsui, 82, Japanese actor (Super Giant).
Wesley Warren, Jr., 50, American scrotal elephantiasis victim, heart attack.

15
Reşat Amet, 39, Crimean Tatar activist, murdered.
Maria Anzai, 60, Japanese singer.
Scott Asheton, 64, American drummer (The Stooges), heart attack.
David Brenner, 78, American comedian, cancer.
Charlotte Brooks, 95, American photographer (Look).
Andrew Kenneth Burroughs, 60, British consultant physician.
Bo Callaway, 86, American politician, Secretary of the Army, member of the US House of Representatives for Georgia, complications from a brain hemorrhage.
Mars Cramer, 85, Dutch economist.
Paddy Cronin, 88, Irish fiddler.
Huseyn Derya, 38, Azerbaijani rapper, traffic collision.
Clarissa Dickson Wright, 66, English celebrity chef and television personality (Two Fat Ladies).
H. Hugh Fudenberg, 85, American immunologist.
Everett L. Fullam, 82, American Episcopalian priest.
Jürgen Kurbjuhn, 73, German footballer (Hamburger SV).
Jesper Langballe, 74, Danish politician, MP for Viborg (2001–2011).
Jim Mikol, 75, Canadian ice hockey player (New York Rangers).
Luca Moro, 41, Italian race car driver, brain tumor.
Cees Veerman, 70, Dutch singer and musician (The Cats).

16
George E. Barker, 83-84, British philatelist.
Gary Bettenhausen, 72, American race car driver.
Marc Blondel, 75, French trade union leader.
Markus Brüderlin, 55, Swiss art historian and curator.
Carlos Camus, 87, Chilean Roman Catholic prelate, Bishop of Copiapó (1968–1976) and Linares (1976–2003). 
Donald Crothers, 77, American chemist.
Lapiro de Mbanga, 56, Cameroonian musician, political and social activist, cancer.
DJ Edwin, 46, Australian DJ, remixer, songwriter and producer, heart attack.
Joseph Fan Zhongliang, 95, Chinese Roman Catholic prelate and confined dissident, Bishop of Shanghai (since 2000).
Sanjeeva Kaviratne, 47, Sri Lankan politician, member of the Central Provincial Council, MP for Matale District.
Mitch Leigh, 86, American Tony Award-winning composer (Man of La Mancha), pneumonia as a complication of a stroke.
Yulisa Pat Amadu Maddy, 77, Sierra Leonean poet, playwright, novelist and political prisoner.
Steve Moore, 64, British cartoonist and writer.
Frank Oliver, 65, New Zealand rugby player and coach.
Alexander Pochinok, 56, Russian economist, Minister of Taxes and Levies (1999–2000), Minister of Labor and Social Development (2000–2004), cardiac arrest.
Renzo Ranuzzi, 89, Italian Olympic basketball player.
Chuck Scherza, 91, Canadian ice hockey player (Boston Bruins, New York Rangers).
Cesare Segre, 85, Italian philologist, semiotician and literary critic.
Nicholas Spaeth, 64, American lawyer, North Dakota Attorney General (1985–1992).
Kenneth Wade, 81, British chemist.
Denké Kossi Wazo, 55, Togolese footballer.

17
Mareike Carrière, 59, German actress, bladder cancer.
Jim Compton, 72, American journalist (NBC News), heart attack.
José Delicado Baeza, 87, Spanish Roman Catholic prelate, Archbishop of Valladolid (1975–2002).
Mercy Edirisinghe, 68, Sri Lankan actress and singer. 
Charley Feeney, 89, American sportswriter.
Gene Feist, 91, American playwright and theatre director, co-founder of the Roundabout Theater Company.
Marek Galiński, 39, Polish Olympic cyclist (1996, 2000, 2004, 2008), traffic collision.
Joseph Kerman, 89, American musicologist.
Donald Michael Kraig, 62, American occultist author and practitioner, pancreatic cancer. 
Paddy McGuigan, 74, Irish songwriter ("The Men Behind the Wire", "The Boys of the Old Brigade") and musician (The Barleycorn).
Rachel Lambert Mellon, 103, American horticulturalist and arts patron.
Oswald Morris, 98, British cinematographer (Fiddler on the Roof, The Guns of Navarone, Oliver!).
Antoni Opolski, 100, Polish physicist.
Mohamed Salah Jedidi, 76, Tunisian footballer (Club Africain).
L'Wren Scott, 49, American fashion designer and model, suicide by hanging.
Egon Sendler, 90, German-born French Jesuit priest and art historian.
James E. Stowers, 90, American investment management executive and philanthropist, founder of American Century Investments.
Roy Trantham, 73, American stock car racing driver, leukemia.
Quinto Vadi, 92, Italian Olympic gymnast (1948, 1952).

18
Catherine Obianuju Acholonu, 62, Nigerian academic and feminist scholar, kidney failure. 
Jeffrey Anderson, 85, Canadian broadcaster, journalist and producer, CBC London bureau chief.
Jorge Arvizu, 81, Mexican voice actor, heart failure.
Karl Baumgartner, 65, Italian-born German film producer (Le Havre, Underground).
Albert Dormer, 88, British bridge player.
Kaiser Kalambo, 60, Zambian football player and coach, prostate cancer. 
Derek Knee, 91, British military interpreter (Field Marshal Montgomery).
Serhiy Kokurin, 36, Ukrainian soldier, shot.
Joe Lala, 66, American musician and actor (Monsters, Inc., On Deadly Ground), complications from lung cancer.
Tivadar Monostori, 77, Hungarian footballer (Dorogi FC).
Molavi Ahmad Narouei, 51, Iranian Sunni theologian, human rights activist and journalist.
Lucius Shepard, 70, American science fiction author.
Ara Shiraz, 72, Armenian architect and sculptor, complications from stroke.
Ben Staartjes, 85, Dutch Olympic sailor.
Raili Tuominen-Hämäläinen, 81, Finnish Olympic gymnast.

19
Robert Butler, 70, American artist, member of The Highwaymen, complications from diabetes.
Ken Forsse, 77, American inventor and television producer, creator of the Teddy Ruxpin, heart failure.
Patrick Joseph McGovern, 76, American technology executive, founder and chairman of IDG.
Ernest Mühlen, 87, Luxembourgian politician, MEP (1984–1989), MP (1989–1991).
Fred Phelps, 84, American pastor and anti-gay activist, founder of the Westboro Baptist Church.
Philip Saliba, 82, Lebanese-born American Orthodox prelate, Metropolitan of the AOCANA (since 1966).
Enric Ribelles, 80, Spanish footballer.
Heather Robertson, 72, Canadian journalist (Winnipeg Free Press) and author, cancer.
Robert S. Strauss, 95, American politician and diplomat, Ambassador to Russia (1991–1992).
László Szőke, 83, Hungarian footballer.
Hank Utley, 89, American author and historian, executive director of Boys Club.
Idly Walpoth, 93, Swiss Olympian 
Lawrence Walsh, 102, American lawyer and judge, Independent Counsel for the Iran–Contra affair, member of the US District Court for Southern New York (1954–1957).
Joseph F. Weis, Jr., 91, American judge, U.S. Court of Appeals – Third Circuit (1973–1988), U.S. District Court for Western Pennsylvania (1970–1973), kidney failure.

20
Ragesh Asthana, 51, Ugandan-born Indian actor, heart attack.
Hennie Aucamp, 80, South African poet, short story writer, cabaretist and academic.
Iñaki Azkuna, 71, Spanish Basque politician, Mayor of Bilbao (since 1999) and World Mayor (2012), prostate cancer.
Hilderaldo Bellini, 83, Brazilian footballer, two-time World Cup winner (1958, 1962), complications from a heart attack.
Andrzej Grzegorczyk, 91, Polish mathematician.
Judy Harrow, 69, American author and Wiccan priestess.
Dick Heller, 76, American sportswriter (The Washington Times).
Dennis Jackson, 82, English footballer (Aston Villa).
Thomas Jolley, 70, American anti–war protester.
Mohamed Mjid, 97, Moroccan politician.
Kristian Mosegaard, 83, Danish footballer.
Tonie Nathan, 91, American politician, first woman to receive an electoral vote in a presidential election, Alzheimer's disease.
Tommy O'Connell, 83, American football player (Cleveland Browns, Buffalo Bills).
Ahmad Sardar, 40, Afghan journalist (Agence France-Presse), shot.
Khushwant Singh, 99, Indian journalist and author (Train to Pakistan).
William Toomath, 88, New Zealand architect.
Marc-Adélard Tremblay, 91, Canadian anthropologist.
Murray Weidenbaum, 87, American economist, Chairperson of the Council of Economic Advisers (1981–1982).

21
Deborah Backer, 54, Guyanese politician, Deputy Speaker of the National Assembly.
Qoriniasi Bale, 85, Fijian lawyer and politician, Attorney-General (1984–1987, 2001–2006).
David Beaglehole, 76, New Zealand physicist.
Bill Boedeker, 90, American football player (Cleveland Browns).
Jim Brasco, 83, American basketball player. 
Jack Fleck, 92, American professional golfer, winner of the U.S. Open (1955).
Linda Gerard, 75, American cabaret artist, cancer.
Michael Henley, 76, British Anglican prelate, Bishop of St Andrews, Dunkeld and Dunblane (1995–2004).
Ignatius Zakka I Iwas, 80, Iraqi religious leader, Patriarch of the Syriac Orthodox Church (since 1980).
Terry David Jones, 75, Canadian politician.
Vincent Lamberti, 86, American medical researcher, developed the original Dove Soap bar, complications from heart failure.
André Lavagne, 100, French composer.
Edward E. Masters, 89, American diplomat, Ambassador to Bangladesh (1976–1977) and Indonesia (1977–1981).
Simeon Oduoye, 68, Nigerian politician, Senator for Osun (2003–2007).
Kiril Pandov, 85, Bulgarian footballer (PFC Spartak Varna).
Kostis Papagiorgis, 66, Greek writer and translator.
Nenad Petrović, 88, Serbian writer.
James Rebhorn, 65, American actor (Scent of a Woman, Independence Day, Homeland), melanoma.
Oddvar Rønnestad, 78, Norwegian Olympic alpine skier.
Adrian Taylor, 60, American television news producer (60 Minutes, The Early Show), winner of the Peabody Award (2013), pancreatic cancer.
Sir Colin Turner, 92, British politician, MP for Woolwich West (1959–1964).
William Vahey, 64, American schoolteacher and child molester, suicide by stabbing.

22
Hermann Buhl, 78, German Olympic athlete.
Yashwant Vithoba Chittal, 85, Indian Sahitya Akademi Award-winning author (The Boy who Talked to Trees).
Mickey Duff, 84, Polish-born British boxing manager and promoter, International Boxing Hall of Fame inductee (1999).
Kurt Rudolf Fischer, 92, Austrian philosopher.
Riina Gerretz, 74, Estonian pianist.
Hamza Abu al-Haija, c. 23, Palestinian militant (Hamas), shot.
Yngve A. A. Larsson, 97, Swedish pediatrician, professor of medicine and diabetologist.
Thor Listau, 75, Norwegian politician, Minister of Fisheries (1981–1985), MP for Finnmark (1973–1985).
Robert Meyers, 89, Canadian Olympic champion ice hockey player (1952). 
Tasos Mitsopoulos, 48, Cypriot politician, Defence Minister (2014), MP (2006–2013), complications from a brain haemorrhage.
Ken Plant, 88, English footballer (Nuneaton Borough, Colchester United).
Lou Rell, 73, American Naval and commercial aviator, First Gentleman of Connecticut (2004–2011), cancer.
Siddakatte Chennappa Shetty, 62, Indian Yakshagana orator.
Patrice Wymore, 87, American actress (The Errol Flynn Theatre, Ocean's 11) and philanthropist.

23
Abdul Hakim, Bangladeshi politician.
Ashley Booth, 76, Scottish footballer (St Johnstone, East Fife).
Carmelo Bossi, 74, Italian Olympic silver-medalist boxer (1960) and world junior middleweight champion (1970-1971).
Dave Brockie, 50, Canadian-born American heavy metal singer (Gwar), heroin overdose.
Jack Clancy, 79, Australian football player.
Bobby Croft, 68, Canadian basketball player (Kentucky Colonels, Texas Chaparrals), first Canadian to get a full scholarship to NCAA school for basketball.
Miller M. Duris, 86, American politician, Mayor of Hillsboro, Oregon (1973–1977).
Walter Ewbank, 96, British Anglican prelate, Archdeacon of Westmorland and Furness (1971–1977), Archdeacon of Carlisle (1978–1984).
David Henshaw, 74, New Zealand cartoonist.
Roy Peter Martin, 83, British author.
Jürg Neuenschwander, 67, Swiss organist and composer, cerebral hemorrhage.
Peter Oakley, 86, British Internet vlogger, cancer.
B. Palaniappan, 83, Indian gynaecologist.
William Peters, 90, British diplomat and activist (Jubilee 2000).
Parviz C. Radji, 77, Iranian diplomat, Ambassador to the United Kingdom (1976–1979). 
Jaroslav Šerých, 86, Czech painter, printmaker and illustrator.
Miroslav Štěpán, 68, Czechoslovakian politician, member of the Central Committee for the Communist Party (1988–1989), complications from cancer.
Adolfo Suárez, 81, Spanish politician and lawyer, Prime Minister (1976–1981) and leader of Spanish transition to democracy, Duke of Suárez (since 1981), respiratory infection.

24
Giuseppe Agostino, 85, Italian Roman Catholic prelate, Archbishop of Crotone-Santa Severina (1973–1998) and Cosenza-Bisignano (1998–2004). 
Geoff Bradford, 80, English guitarist.
Victor Hugo Caula, 86, Argentinian cameraman and director of photography.
Robert F. Coleman, 59, American mathematician.
Margaret di Menna, 90, New Zealand microbiologist.
Rusi Dinshaw, 86, Pakistani cricketer.
Arne Løvlie, 83, Norwegian zoologist.
Jean-François Mattéi, 73, French philosopher.
Tom Mikula, 87, American football player (Brooklyn Dodgers).
Oleksandr Muzychko, 51, Ukrainian political activist, shot.
Bryan Orritt, 77, Welsh footballer (Birmingham City, Middlesbrough), stroke.
Kuldeep Pawar, 65, Indian actor, kidney failure.
Paulo Schroeber, 40, Brazilian guitarist (Almah), heart failure.
John Rowe Townsend, 91, British children's author (The Intruder).
David A. Trampier, 59, American fantasy gaming artist (Dungeons & Dragons).
Rodney Wilkes, 89, Trinidadian Olympic silver- and bronze-medalist weightlifter (1948, 1952).

25
Lorna Arnold, 98, British nuclear historian and author, stroke.
Harm de Blij, 78, Dutch-born American geographer.
Meredith Bordeaux, 101, American politician, member of the Maine House of Representatives (1979–1982).
Dil Bahadur Lama, 84, Nepali politician and police official, cardiac arrest.
Jeffery Dench, 85, British actor (First Knight).
Hank Lauricella, 83, American Hall of Fame football player (Tennessee Volunteers) and politician, member of the Louisiana House of Representatives (1966–1972) and Senate (1972–1996).
Eddie Lawrence, 95, American actor, comedian and singer.
Jon Lord, 57, Canadian politician, Alberta MLA for Calgary-Currie (2001–2004), heart attack.
Nicky McFadden, 51, Irish politician, TD for Longford–Westmeath (since 2011), complications from motor neurone disease.
*Ángel César Mendoza Arámburo, 79, Mexican politician, Governor of Baja California Sur (1975–1981).
Nanda, 75, Indian actress (Teen Devian, Gumnaam, Chhoti Bahen), heart attack.
Frank O'Keeffe, 91, Irish Gaelic football player (Kerry).
Mohammad Ebrahim Bastani Parizi, 89, Iranian historian and author.
Reinhold Pommer, 79, German Olympic cyclist (1956).
Joseph Purtill, 86, American politician and judge, member of the Connecticut House of Representatives (1959–1961).
Jerry Roberts, 93, British wartime codebreaker, member of the Testery unit.
Sonny Ruberto, 68, American baseball player (San Diego Padres), cancer.
Jonathan Schell, 70, American author, journalist and anti-war activist, cancer.
Thi. Ka. Sivasankaran, 88, Indian Sahitya Akademi Award-winning author and literary critic.
Robert Slater, 70, American author and journalist, complications from influenza.
Ralph Wilson, 95, American Hall of Fame football team owner (Buffalo Bills) and racehorse breeder (Arazi), co-founder of the AFL.
Lode Wouters, 84, Belgian Olympic gold- and bronze-medalist cyclist (1948).

26
Roger Birkman, 95, American organizational psychologist.
George Bookasta, 96, American child actor, pneumonia.
Gangaram Choudhary, 92, Indian politician.
Chu Teh-Chun, 93, Chinese-born French painter.
Shun Lien Chuang, 59, American engineer.
John Garry Clifford, 72, American historian.
John Disney, 94, Australian ornithologist. 
Warren Forma, 90, American documentary filmmaker and author.
Barbara Halloran Gibbons, 80, American cookbook author and columnist.
Dick Guidry, 84, American politician, member of the Louisiana House of Representatives (1950–1954, 1964–1976).
Tom Jones, 90, Australian politician, Member for Collie (1968–1989).
Marcus Kimball, Baron Kimball, 85, British politician, MP for Gainsborough (1956–1983). 
Wolfgang Kirchgässner, 85, German Roman Catholic prelate, Auxiliary Bishop of Freiburg im Breisgau (1979–1998).
Thomas Landauer, 81, American experimental psychologist.
George Lerchen, 91, American baseball player (Detroit Tigers, Cincinnati Redlegs).
Mark Stock, 62, American artist, enlarged heart.

27
Francine Beers, 89, American actress (Law & Order, Three Men and a Baby, Keeping the Faith).
Bertrando, 25, American Thoroughbred Champion racehorse (Woodward Stakes, Goodwood Breeder's Cup Handicap, Pacific Classic Stakes).
Al Cihocki, 89, American baseball player (Cleveland Indians).
Kent Cochrane, 62, Canadian amnesiac, had one of the most studied human brains.
Max Coll, 82, American politician, member of the New Mexico House of Representatives (1972–2004), stroke.
John Cornes, 66, Australian rugby player.
Jean-Claude Colliard, 68, French political scientist and politician, member of the Constitutional Council (1998–2007).
Nevio de Zordo, 71, Italian Olympic silver-medalist bobsledder (1972).
Augustin Deleanu, 69, Romanian footballer (Dinamo București).
Richard N. Frye, 94, American scholar of Armenian studies.
Hal M. Lattimore, 93, American judge, member of the Texas Court of Appeals.
Per Lillo-Stenberg, 85, Norwegian actor.
Joseph Madachy, 87, American research chemist and mathematician, editor of Journal of Recreational Mathematics.
Derek Martinus, 82, British television director (Doctor Who, Blake's 7, Z-Cars), Alzheimer's disease.
Robert Ojo, 72, Nigerian Olympic sprinter.
Gina Pellón, 87, Cuban painter.
P. Ramdas, 83, Indian film director, winner of the J. C. Daniel Award (2007).
Joseph Rigano, 80, American actor (Casino, Mickey Blue Eyes, Analyze This), throat cancer.
James R. Schlesinger, 85, American government official, Director of the CIA (1973), Secretary of Defense (1973–1975), Secretary of Energy (1977–1979), pneumonia.
Michael Schofield, 94, British sociologist and campaigner.
Arsenio Valdez, 71, Paraguayan footballer.

28
GOK Ajayi, 82, Nigerian lawyer.
Mayada Ashraf, 21-22, Egyptian journalist, shot.
Rawle Barrow, 79, Trinidad and Tobago Olympic sailor.
Carlos Miguel Benn, 89, Argentine yacht racer. (death announced on this date)
Jeremiah Denton, 89, American politician and military officer, Senator from Alabama (1981–1987), recipient of the Navy Cross, complications from a heart ailment.
Edwin Kagin, 73, American lawyer, national legal director for the American Atheists, heart disease.
Michael F. Lappert, 85, British chemist.
Billy Longley, 88, Australian criminal.
Sam McAughtry, 91, Northern Irish writer and broadcaster.
Godfrey Mdimi Mhogolo, 62, Tanzanian Anglican prelate, Bishop of Central Tanganyika (since 1989), lung infection.
Michael Putney, 67, Australian Roman Catholic prelate, Bishop of Townsville (since 2001), stomach cancer.
Lorenzo Semple, Jr., 91, American screenwriter (Batman, Flash Gordon, Three Days of the Condor).
Avraham Yaski, 86, Romanian-born Israeli architect and academic, recipient of the Israel Prize (1982).

29
Hobart Alter, 80, American surfer and boat designer (Hobie cat).
Lelio Antoniotti, 86, Italian footballer.
Catherine Hayes Bailey, 92, American plant geneticist.
Roderick Bell, 66, Canadian diplomat.
Mark Chamberlain, 82, American educator, President of Rowan University (1969–1984).
Yosef Hamadani Cohen, 98, Iranian Jewish prelate, Chief Rabbi of Iran (since 1994).
Karl Spillman Forester, 73, American senior (former chief) judge, member of the US District Court for Eastern Kentucky (since 1988).
Robin Gibson, 83, Australian architect (Queensland Cultural Centre). (death announced on this date)
Elbert Gill, 82, American politician, member of the Tennessee House of Representatives (1966–1986).
Billy Mundi, 71, American drummer (The Mothers of Invention, Rhinoceros), complications from diabetes.
Marc Platt, 100, American dancer and actor (Oklahoma!, Seven Brides for Seven Brothers).
Oldřich Škácha, 72, Czech photographer and dissident.
Ron Stott, 76, American politician, member of the New York State Assembly (1975–1977), Mayor of North Syracuse, New York (1971–1974).
Birgitta Valberg, 97, Swedish actress.
Dane Witherspoon, 56, American actor (Santa Barbara, Capitol).

30
Muhammadu Kudu Abubakar, 52, Nigerian Emir of Agaie (since 2004).
Robert Billingham, 56, American Olympic silver medal-winning sailor (1988), official and skipper, member of 1992 America's Cup winning team.
Richard Black, 92, American commercial artist and landscape painter, creator of the Mr. Clean and Smokey Bear mascots.
Thomas Ryan Byrne, 91, American historian, economist, and diplomat.
Sean Cusack, 87, Irish soccer player.
Gerardo D'Ambrosio, 83, Italian politician and magistrate.
Michael Edmonds, 87, British artist, co-founder of 56 Group Wales.
Sir David Gibbons, 85, Bermudian politician, Premier (1977–1982).
Jan de Graaff, 70, Dutch television journalist.
Ray Hutchison, 81, American politician, member of the Texas House of Representatives (1973–1977).
Keizō Kanie, 69, Japanese actor, stomach cancer. 
Kate O'Mara, 74, English actress (Dynasty, Doctor Who, Howards' Way), ovarian cancer.
Phuntsok Wangyal, 92, Chinese Tibetan politician, military leader and government critic, led invasion of Tibet (1950–1951).
Fred Stansfield, 96, Welsh international footballer.

31
Gonzalo Anes, 82, Spanish historian, Director of Real Academia de la Historia (since 1998).
Anthony Beattie, 69, British civil servant, complications from a fall.
Irene Fernandez, 67, Malaysian advocate for women and migrant workers, heart failure.
Władysław Filipowiak, 87, Polish archaeologist and historian.
Bryan Gahol, 36, Filipino basketball player, traffic collision.
David Hannay, 74, Australian film producer.
Edmond Harjo, 96, American Seminole Code Talker during World War II, recipient of the Congressional Gold Medal (2013), heart attack.
Ben Johnson, 74, American Makah tribal politician and fisheries expert, heart attack.
Charles Keating, 90, American banker, key figure in the savings and loan crisis.
Frankie Knuckles, 59, American disc jockey and record producer, complications from diabetes.
Bob Larbey, 79, British comedy scriptwriter (Please Sir!,  The Good Life, As Time Goes By).
Ferdinand Masset, 93, Swiss politician.
Jimmy Newton, 35-36, American Southern Ute tribal chief, Chairman of the Reservation (since 2011).
Bob Ringma, 85, Canadian politician and army officer.
Max Robinson, 81, Australian politician, member of the Tasmanian House of Assembly (1976–1979).
Hermann von Siebenthal, 79, Swiss Olympic equestrian.
Enrique Plancarte Solís, 43, Mexican drug lord, shot.
Roger Somville, 90, Belgian painter.
Asep Sunandar Sunarya, 58, Indonesian wayang golek puppeteer, heart attack.
Ahmet Yorulmaz, 81-82, Turkish writer.

References

2014-03
 03